The American Motors Corporation (AMC) used V8, straight-6, V6, and straight-4 engines in various passenger automobiles and Jeep vehicles from 1954 onward. American Motors designed some of its engines; others were inherited from its constituents. The company bought other engines or engine designs from other manufacturers.

Four cylinder engines
American Motors used several four-cylinder engine designs.

Air-cooled 108
The  is an AMC designed air-cooled V4 engine that was used in AMC's lightweight aluminium-bodied M422 'Mighty Mite' military vehicle, built from January 1960 to January 1963 as an air transportable (by the helicopters of the time) Jeep for the U.S. Marine Corps. This engine was unsuitable for regular passenger car use mainly due to its relatively small displacement and power output.

 Bore and stroke: 
 Compression: 7.5:1
 Horsepower:  @ 3,600 rpm
 Torque:  @ 2,500 rpm

Audi/VW 121
The  was an advanced design overhead camshaft four-cylinder EA831 engine bought from Audi/Volkswagen 1977 through 1979. Though a small engine, its advanced design created reasonable power for its size and due to being an OHC engine, it had a high redline. This engine was also used in the Audi 100, Volkswagen LT van, and Porsche 924. The engine was assembled to AMC specs in the US at a specifically purchased AMC assembly plant. Specifications are different from the Audi/VW/Porsche assembled engine. AMC used a carburetor and standard points ignition as well as slightly larger clearances.

The original agreement was for AMC to buy the design, eventually moving manufacturing to the United States and selling the engines back to VW and Audi. American Motors bought a plant specifically to build the engine, but never sold enough to move complete manufacturing. The AMC engines were assembled in the U.S. from major castings supplied by VW, hence the different assembly clearances. As part of the agreement, AMC was not to use the VW or Audi names when referring to the engine. Everyone familiar with the design knew they were virtually identical, and the automotive press commonly referred to them as Audi or VW engines. VW/Audi/Porsche U.S. spec engines produced  in mid-1977; earlier models produced  --  more than the AMC version.

 Bore × stroke 3.406" × 3.323" (86.5mm x 84.4mm)
 Compression ratio 8.1:1
 Horsepower (net)  @ 5,000 rpm
 Torque (net)  @ 2,800 rpm

It was used in the AMC Gremlin, AMC Spirit, and AMC Concord, The only Jeep this engine was used in was the 1979 Jeep DJ (Dispatcher or Postal Delivery). In the DJ5G, it was mated only to a 3-speed A904 automatic transmission with a VW/Audi pattern bellhousing. In AMC passenger cars with manual transmission, this engine was mated to a BorgWarner HR-1 4-speed transmission. Passenger cars with automatic also used the A904.

It shares the bellhousing pattern with several German cars (Audi 5-cylinder inline), although it does not share the bellhousing pattern with the VW Rabbit diesel line of engines.

Renault 126 turbodiesel 

The Renault-developed  4-cylinder turbodiesel was an optional engine used in AMC's Jeep line between 1984 and 1986. It was mated to a standard four-speed or optional five-speed manual, and with either transmission delivered exceptional fuel economy. The engine was also known for relatively instant pedal response at a time when both diesel- and turbocharger-equipped engines generally were known for a noticeable lag. Weighing in at only , it also featured first-tier technology for the time such as an intercooler and an overhead cam. When it reached the market, it marked the first time a turbocharged diesel was offered in a sports-utility vehicle in the United States.

Pontiac 151 
The  is commonly referred to as the "Iron Duke" and is a Pontiac design. It was purchased by AMC from 1979 through 1983 as the base option in the RWD Spirit and Concord, the 4WD Eagle models, economy versions of Jeep CJs, and in postal Jeeps. This early version used a Chevrolet small block V8 bell housing bolt pattern. The 1984 and later model GM 151s used the corporate GM four-cylinder/small V6 bolt pattern (not used by AMC).

 Bore × Stroke 4.00" × 3.00"
 Compression Ratio 8.2:1
 Horsepower (net)  @ 4,000 rpm
 Torque (net)  @ 2,600 rpm

AMC 150

In 1984 AMC introduced its own four-cylinder engine design. All previous fours (with the exception of the Air-Cooled 108) were purchased for interim use. The AMC four was only used in Jeep and Eagle vehicles since all other AMC passenger cars ceased production in 1983.

Six-cylinder engines

Nash and Hudson beginnings
When Nash and Hudson merged to form AMC in 1954 all the Hudson bodies were dropped for the 1955 model year. The Ambassador and Statesman received a hasty grille/taillight/trim/dash restyling to create the new Hudson Hornet and Wasp. The Nash Ambassador Six retained the Nash  OHV six for 1955 and 1956, V8 only for 1957. The Nash OHV six, dating back to 1934, was a totally different design than the Rambler 195.6. This was the only major Hudson component left - it dated back to the 1940s. All Rambler models, whether badged Hudson or Nash, used the Rambler  OHV six. This design dates back to 1940, when it was introduced in the Nash 600 as an L-head  engine. The block casting was changed to allow an OHV head for the 1956 Rambler (the L-head was discontinued).

Rambler 195.6
This motor was originally a Nash design dating back to 1940. AMC used an L-head (flat-head, 1955, 1958–65) and OHV (1956–1965) version, as well as an aluminum block version (1961–1963). All shared the same bore and stroke as well as some other features/components. For more information see AMC Straight-6 engine.

Kaiser 230

American Motors neither designed the Tornado 230 nor used it in a domestic AMC-branded vehicle. Subsidiary Industrias Kaiser Argentina (IKA) produced this engine in Argentina after the 1970 merger and used it in a variety of vehicles. In the United States, this engine is often confused with the AMC/Jeep , which Kaiser Jeep purchased to replace the SOHC Kaiser engine  in 1965. 

The Tornado first appeared in civilian Jeep vehicles in 1963 and was only used until 1965. The US Army M-715 and derivatives used it through the 1960s and early 1970s. The AMC and Kaiser engines do not share bellhousing bolt patterns. Cam trouble on the 230 was common due to inadequate oil formulations of the time. 

Its under-square bore and stroke endeared the engine for low-speed torque. It was a dependable engine with reports of them going 250,000 mi. with no major problems—with proper maintenance. Production continued through 1983 in Argentina where AMC used it in passenger cars and Kaiser in Jeeps.

Buick 225

Kaiser introduced the "Dauntless"  V6 engine in the 1966 CJ and as an option in the C101 Jeepster Commando. Kaiser bought the tooling from Buick to build the 225 during the short period prior to selling its Jeep subsidiary to AMC.

American Motors retained the Buick engine briefly after it bought Jeep. The engine was retired in 1971 shortly after AMC acquired Kaiser in 1970. American Motors sold the tooling back to General Motors in 1974.

The engine was an odd-fire V6, meaning that TDC for the cylinders was not evenly spaced around the engine but grouped in pairs. The engines in Jeeps featured a heavier flywheel than the Buick version to help dampen vibrations resulting from the engine's firing pattern. The engine was known at the time for its power and reliability. It would idle slowly, but not as smooth as other engines, especially the inline sixes. 

This engine was used in the following vehicles:
 Jeep CJ-5
 Jeep CJ-6
 C101 Jeepster Commando
 various small Buicks from 1960 to 1964

The Modern Era I-6

American Motors designed an entirely new six-cylinder engine for 1964 and introduced the 232 in the new Classic Hardtop as the Typhoon.  In 1965 AMC introduced the more economical 199 in the Rambler American.  In the 1970s, VAM (See Vehículos Automotores Mexicanos) introduced a 282-cubic-inch version of the engine.  American Motors and Chrysler produced the basic design constantly through 2006 (AMC was bought out by Chrysler in late 1987).

The early engines' bell pattern differed from AMC V8s. In 1971 AMC raised the block height and lengthened the stroke on the 199 and early 232 engines. The 199 became 232 cubic inches and the 232 became 258. These two RB or "raised block" engines shared the small bell pattern of the earlier engines for only the 1971 model year. In 1972 both the 232 as well as the 258 changed bell pattern to match AMC V8s, in conjunction with AMC's switch from Borg-Warner to Chrysler-built automatic transmissions.

General Motors V6

 GM 60-Degree LR2 V6 engine

This engine was used in:
 1984–1986 Jeep Cherokee (XJ)
 numerous GM vehicles

V8 Engines

American Motors purchased V8 engines from Packard before introducing its in-house-designed V8. The automaker used these Packard engines exclusively in 1955 and 1956 Nash Ambassadors and Hudson Hornets. The Packard  engine was used in 1955, and switched to the  version for the 1956 model year. All Packard V8 powered AMCs came with Packard's Ultramatic automatic transmission.

Late in 1956, AMC introduced its own V8 design in a  version and used it only in the Ambassador and Hornet Special models. The Specials were actually the slightly smaller and lighter Statesman/Wasp two-door hardtop bodies with Ambassador/Hornet trim. The Packard engines were dropped after 1956 in favor of the AMC-developed-and-built V8s.

This was AMC's first V8 engine design and became known as the Rambler V8 as they made their transformation from Nash and Hudson into Rambler, heralding Rambler products as an official division of American Motors Corporation.

At 601 lbs, as officially declared by AMC, the Rambler V8 weighs only 26 lbs. more than Chevrolet's small block generic weight of 575 lbs, but its target competitor's offerings typically weighed much more, such as the largest Studebaker 289 V8 weighing in around 675 lbs.

AMC introduced their new '57  CID version in the Rambler Rebel, which gave it an advantageous power to weight ratio whereby it may be considered as one of the first muscle cars.

All '56-'66 AMC Rambler V8 engines feature a 10" deck height, which by Ford standards, is the dividing line between 'small blocks' and 'big blocks', so the typical 'other make' automotive jargon does not add any useful description.

All '66-'91 AMC V8s have the same 4.75" bore spacing as the Rambler V8 and the same crankshaft to camshaft centerline distance but this second AMC V8 design weighs less for a variety of technical reasons. The '66-'91 AMC V8's generic engine weight is 540 lbs.

The  AMC V8 continued to be manufactured after Chrysler bought out American Motors in 1987, and was the only engine available in the Jeep Grand Wagoneer through the 1991 model year.

AMC Rambler V8 10" Tall Deck (1956–1966) (also known as AMC Gen1 V8)

AMC Short-Deck V8 square port exhaust (1966–1970) (also known as AMC Gen2 V8) 

"AMX"

AMC Raised-Deck V8 dog leg port exhaust (1970–1991) (also known as AMC Gen3 V8)

See also
 AMC straight-4 engine
 AMC straight-6 engine
 AMC V8 engine
 AMC/Jeep Transmissions
 List of Chrysler engines

References

External links

 AMCyclopedia
 AMC Rambler Car Club
 The American Motors Owners Association

 
Engines - Overview
Chrysler engines
Jeep engines
Lists of automobile engines